The Conscience of Hassan Bey is a 1913 American short drama film directed by  D. W. Griffith and Christy Cabanne.

Cast
 William A. Carroll
 Lillian Gish

References

External links

1913 films
Films directed by D. W. Griffith
Films directed by Christy Cabanne
American silent short films
1913 drama films
1913 short films
American black-and-white films
Silent American drama films
1910s American films